Yunnan Flying Tigers Football Club is a professional Chinese football club based in Lijiang, Yunnan and their home stadium is the Lijiang Sports Development Centre Stadium that has a seating capacity of 22,400. The club's current major investors are the Kunming Minjian Mechanical & Electrical Equipment Limited Company along with Lijiang Materials Co. Ltd. and Lijiang Lijiang Taihe Group.

History
After the disbandment of Yunnan Lijiang Dongba F.C. in 2006 it was decided by the Yunnan Sports Bureau, Yunnan Football Association, Lijiang Municipal People's Government, Lijiang Sports Bureau and Lijiang Football Association to help form another professional football team to help represent the province. This was realised in September 2012 when Lijiang Jiayunhao F.C. was officially registered within the Chinese football association to participate the 2013 China League Two division and by December 5, 2012 Niu Hongli was appointed as their first Head coach. The Lijiang Sports Development Centre Stadium was chosen as their home location and the team played in an all green home kit. On May 6, 2013 Kunming Minjian Mechanical & Electrical Equipment Limited Company along with Lijiang Materials Co. Ltd. and Lijiang Lijiang Taihe Group. would all become major investors within the team.

In their debut season the club would reach the divisions play-off where they were knocked out in the quarter-finals by Hebei Zhongji 3–2 on aggregate. By the 2015 league season the club would change their crest and colours to blue. After several seasons where they continued to reach the division play-off the club finally gained promotion when the club's Head coach Zhang Biao led them to win the division after defeating Baoding Yingli ETS 2–0 in the play-off final.
In January 2017, Lijiang Jiayunhao F.C. changed their name to Yunnan Lijiang F.C.. Their nickname Flying Tigers is a homage to the famous 1st American Volunteer Group in World War II, nicknamed the Flying Tigers, based in Yunnan Province in China.

In January 2018, Yunnan Lijiang F.C. changed their name to Yunnan Flying Tigers F.C. following their relegation back to China League Two after finishing last in the 2017 China League One. During the season, the club's chairman, He Rongyao, was arrested, and the club was revealed for arrearage of salary at the end of 2018 season. On 26 February 2019, Yunnan Flying Tigers officially withdrew from China League Two, and was dissolved.

Name history
2012–2016  Lijiang Jiayunhao F.C. 丽江嘉云昊
2017        Yunnan Lijiang F.C. 云南丽江
2018        Yunnan Flying Tigers F.C. 云南飞虎

Managerial history

  Niu Hongli (2013)
  Li Hu (2014)
  Wang Zheng (2015–2016)
  Zhang Biao (2016)
  Lim Jong-heon (2017)
  Zhang Biao (caretaker) (2017)
  Kurt Garger (2017–2018)
  Huang Yan (2018)

Honours
 China League Two: 2016

Results
All-time league rankings

As of the end of 2018 season.

 In group stage.

Key
 Pld = Played
 W = Games won
 D = Games drawn
 L = Games lost
 F = Goals for
 A = Goals against
 Pts = Points
 Pos = Final position

 DNQ = Did not qualify
 DNE = Did not enter
 NH = Not Held
 – = Does Not Exist
 R1 = Round 1
 R2 = Round 2
 R3 = Round 3
 R4 = Round 4

 F = Final
 SF = Semi-finals
 QF = Quarter-finals
 R16 = Round of 16
 Group = Group stage
 GS2 = Second Group stage
 QR1 = First Qualifying Round
 QR2 = Second Qualifying Round
 QR3 = Third Qualifying Round

References

 
Defunct football clubs in China
Football clubs in China
Lijiang
Sport in Yunnan
Association football clubs established in 2012
2012 establishments in China